The Asco is a small river in the department of Haute-Corse, Corsica, France. It is a tributary of the Golo. The river rises in the Monte Cinto massif among some of the highest mountains of Corsica, passes a ski resort and the old village of Asco and cuts through a dramatic  gorge before joining the Golo.

Course

It crosses the communes of Asco, Canavaggia, Moltifao and Morosaglia.
The source is to the southeast of the  Monte Cinto.

The Asco flows northwest, then north past the Haut-Asco resort, then runs northeast to the village of Asco, east-northeast to the south of the village of Molifao, then east to a point just north of Ponte Leccia, where it joins the Golo.

The D147 follows the river from Haut-Asco to Moltifao, then the D47 follows it to Ponte Leccia.
The D147 is a narrow, steep and winding but well-built road.

Valley

Lower valley and gorge

It runs through a rugged landscape of steep cliffs and granite rocks.
In it the river has carved out large natural pools.
There is little vegetation apart from some juniper and a few pines growing on the steep rick faces.
The gorge draws many tourists in the summer months, attracted by its rugged topography and wild animals.

Village and Genoese bridge

The village is surrounded by junipers, and clings to the mountainside.
The road to this village was first opened in 1936.
Today many of the old houses have been renovated.
The village has a war memorial and the parish church of Archangel Saint Michael, with stone walls and a bell tower.
The church was built in the 11th century, and is classified.

The nearby Genoese bridge was built in the 15th century when Corsica was occupied by the Republic of Genoa.

Upper valley

The resort opens when there is enough snow, and has two fairly easy  ski slopes and two  beginner slopes.
There is an eco-museum at Haut-Asco.
The GR20 (Grande Randonnée 20) hiking trail passes through Haut-Asco.
It is a  trail that crosses the high mountain range of Corsica.

The upper Asco valley has an alpine climate and alpine landscapes.
The Stagnu plateau holding the ski resort is surrounded by a crest with some of the highest peaks in Corsica, including Capu Biancu: , Capu au Verdatu: , Punta Selolla: , Capu Ciuntrone: , Monte Cinto: , Pointe des Éboulis: , Punta Crucetta: , Capu Larghia: , Punta Minuta: , Punta Rossa: , Punta Missoghiu: .

Hydrology

Measurements of the river flow were taken at the Morosaglia [Ponte-Leccia] station from 1959 to 2021.

Tributaries
The following streams (ruisseaux) are tributaries of the Asco:

 Tartagine: 
 Pinara: 
 Stretta Grossa: 
 Ombrone: 
 Negretto: 
 Logoniello: 
 Valle Largi Tasso: 
 la Tassineta: 
 Vitucciaghiu: 
 l'Ondella: 
 la Morazzani: 
 la Filettella: 
 Valle Secche: 
 Peduli: 
 Volpaia: 
 Manica: 
 Ghieriosa: 
 Grotta: 
 Ranza: 
 Tidigliani: 
 Casafrancione: 
 Casanovaccia: 
 Santonaccio: 
 Ventosi: 
 Tula: 
 Muro: 
 Castagnaccio: 
 l'Aiale: 
 l'Ondella: 
 Ridondello: 
 Pianelli: 
 Stretta a Merla: 
 Finusellu: 
 Gradelle: 
 Conche: 
 Corbica: 
 Valentinu: 
 Paterna: 
 Perelli: 
 Parci: 
 Pedirasino: 
 Mutola:

Notes

Sources

 

Rivers of Haute-Corse
Rivers of France